Yowa Mabinda Kapinga Mbemba is a Congolese politician.

Yowa Mabinda Kapinga was the Commissioner of Culture & Fine Arts for Zaire.

References

Living people
Year of birth missing (living people)
21st-century Democratic Republic of the Congo women politicians
21st-century Democratic Republic of the Congo politicians